Life Made Simple (Traditional Chinese: 阿旺新傳) is a TVB modern drama series broadcast in October 2005. The series is shown to celebrate TVB's 38th Anniversary.

The series is an indirect sequel to 2002's Square Pegs (戇夫成龍). The main cast features Roger Kwok, Jessica Hsuan, and Leila Tong, returning from the original series, and the new cast includes Bosco Wong and Paul Chun. The indirect sequel takes place in the modern era instead of the ancient setting of its prequel.

Synopsis
The modern version of Ah Wong,
Steps out of his simple world.

Ding Sheung-Wong (Roger Kwok) is a man in his thirties but with an IQ of a seven-year-old. People would make fun of him by calling crazy, but he would tell them that he is just simple. His best friend Wong Kei-Fung (Jessica Hsuan), who were friends since they were young, used to play a game where he was the husband and she was the wife; hence, this is why Wong refers to Fung as his "little wife". One day Fung told Wong that she would have to leave for the United States for four years of college.

When Fung returns to Hong Kong, she finds a job at the Chung (鍾) Corporation where she works under the management of Chung Kam-Wing (Paul Chun) and his son Michael Chung Chi-Chung (Bosco Wong). Later Kam-Wing finds out that Wong is his biological son and recruits him to his company, as well. Angel On Kei (Leila Tong), Fung's cousin, who returned with Fung from the States has a crush on Chi-Chung. But Chi-Chung has a crush on Fung. Fung feels that Wong is the one that can make her truly happy but is puzzled whether to choose Chi-Chung or Wong...

Cast

Main cast

Other cast

Awards and nominations
 Roger Kwok won his second "Best Actor in a Leading Role" Award for his role Ding Sheung-Wong, at the 38th TVB Anniversary Awards in 2005.
 Angela Tong won the "Best Actress in a Supporting Role" Award for her role Li Siu-Ho, at the 38th TVB Anniversary Awards in 2005.

Viewership ratings

References

External links
 TVB.com Life Made Simple - Official Website 

TVB dramas
2005 Hong Kong television series debuts
2005 Hong Kong television series endings